The 2014 Big East men's soccer tournament was the second men's soccer tournament of the new Big East Conference, formed in July 2013 after the original Big East Conference split into two leagues along football lines. Including the history of the original conference, it was the 19th edition of the Big East tournament.

Held from November 11–16, 2014 at PPL Park in Chester, Pennsylvania, it determined the Big East Conference champion, and the automatic berth into the 2014 NCAA Division I Men's Soccer Championship. The tournament was won by the Providence Friars who defeated the Xavier Musketeers in the Big East final.

Bracket

Schedule

First round

Semifinals

Big East Championship

Statistical leaders

Most Goals 

Markus Naglestad – Providence – 2

See also 
 Big East Conference
 Big East Conference Men's Soccer Tournament
 2014 Big East Conference men's soccer season
 2014 NCAA Division I men's soccer season
 2014 NCAA Division I Men's Soccer Championship

References 

2014
Big East Men's Soccer